Akhtar Khan is a British broadcast journalist of Indian descent, and has worked for multiple international broadcasters including BBC World News and BBC News 24 Sky News CNBC Europe and Arise News, New york presenter. He is one of the presenters of Fast Track, a weekly travel program on BBC World News, and has his own radio show on the BBC Asian Network. He is also the roving ambassador for The Prince's Trust, officially representing the Prince of Wales at numerous events. In 2016 with his experience on both sides of the camera and lifestyle programming, Akhtar (publisher and creative director) went on to create a men's lifestyle magazine for 18-45 demographic called 'The Man About Town, New York' (https://www.flipsnack.com/akhtarkhan/the-man-about-town-new-york-fd1cfdvvs.html)

Personal life
Khan's parents are from Hyderabad, while Akhtar was born in London. Akhtar currently shuttles between London, Los Angeles and New York. He has been reported to have dated the Miss World 1999 pageant winner who was also crowned Miss India, Yukta Mookhey. He is an avid world traveller (76 countries and counting) and is a self proclaimed adrenaline junkie.

Career
As of September 2017, The Huffington Post described Khan as having "more than 20 years experience on both sides of the camera", covering areas related to "international affairs, geo-politics, health and fitness, entrepreneurship, current affairs, travel and tourism and, the film industry". Some of his notable reportage has included the September 11 attacks, the first beheading of ISIL and the 2016 United States presidential election.

Khan initially worked as a fund manager in the City of London Investment Trust, before becoming an entertainment journalist with CNBC Europe. Later, he became a film critic at Pearson TV and subsequently joined Sky News, where he became Royal Correspondent.

In August 2003, Khan became one of the presenters of Fast Track, a weekly travel program on BBC World News. Khan has been a regular presenter at the erstwhile BBC News 24, now known as BBC News, apart from hosting his own show on BBC Asian Network. Khan has also been a freelance presenter for BBC Radio 5 Live. Additionally, Khan is a motivational speaker and host at corporate events.

Khan is the roving ambassador for The Prince's Trust, officially representing the Prince of Wales at numerous events.

References

Year of birth missing (living people)
Living people
Place of birth missing (living people)
BBC television presenters
British motivational speakers
Entertainment journalists
British film critics
British reporters and correspondents
British broadcast news analysts
British people of Indian descent
British expatriates in the United States
British television journalists